The following article outlines the statistics for the 2015 FIFA Women's World Cup, which took place in Canada from 6 June to 5 July.

Goals scored from penalty shoot-outs are not counted, and matches decided by penalty shoot-outs are counted as draws.

Goalscorers

Assists

Scoring

Overall
Overall

Timing
 First goal of the tournament: Christine Sinclair (penalty) for Canada against China
 First brace of the tournament: Isabell Herlovsen for Norway against Thailand
 First hat-trick of the tournament: Célia Šašić for Germany against Ivory Coast
 Latest goal in a match: 108 minutesFara Williams (penalty) for England against Germany

Teams
 Most goals scored by a team: 20Germany
 Fewest goals scored by a team: 1Ecuador
 Best goal difference: +14Germany
 Worst goal difference: -16Ecuador
 Most goals scored in a match by both teams: 11Switzerland 10–1 Ecuador
 Most goals scored in a match by one team: 10Germany against Ivory Coast, Switzerland against Ecuador
 Most goals scored in a match by the losing team: 2Ivory Coast against Thailand, Japan against United States
 Biggest margin of victory: 10 goalsGermany 10–0 Ivory Coast
 Most clean sheets achieved by a team: 5United States
 Fewest clean sheets achieved by a team: 0Costa Rica, Ivory Coast, Mexico, Nigeria, South Korea, Spain, Switzerland, Thailand
 Most clean sheets given by an opposing team: 2China, Ecuador, Germany, New Zealand, Nigeria, South Korea, Switzerland, Thailand
 Fewest clean sheets given by an opposing team: 0Japan, Norway
 Most consecutive clean sheets achieved by a team: 5United States
 Most consecutive clean sheets given by an opposing team: 2Germany, New Zealand, Nigeria

Individual

 Most goals scored by one player in a match: 3Ramona Bachmann for Switzerland against Ecuador, Gaëlle Enganamouit for Cameroon against Ecuador, Fabienne Humm for Switzerland against Ecuador, Carli Lloyd for United States against Japan, Anja Mittag for Germany against Ivory Coast, Célia Šašić for Germany against Ivory Coast
 Oldest goal scorer: 37 years, 3 months and 6 daysFormiga for Brazil against South Korea
 Youngest goal scorer: 18 years, 8 months and 3 daysMelissa Herrera for Costa Rica against South Korea

Wins and losses

Match awards

Player of the Match

Clean sheets

Discipline
 Total number of yellow cards: 110
 Average number of yellow cards per match: 2.12
 Total number of red cards: 3
 Average number of red cards per match: 0.06
 First yellow card of the tournament: Desiree Scott – Canada against China PR
 First red card of the tournament: Ligia Moreira – Ecuador against Cameroon
 Fastest dismissal from kick off: 47 minutes – Catalina Pérez – Colombia against United States
 Latest dismissal in a match: 69 minutes – Sarah Nnodim – Nigeria against United States
 Least time difference between two yellow cards given to the same player: 31 minutes – Sarah Nnodim – Nigeria against United States
 Most yellow cards (team): 9 – Colombia
 Most red cards (team): 1 – Colombia, Ecuador, Nigeria
 Fewest yellow cards (team): 0 – Australia, Costa Rica
 Most yellow cards (player): 2 – Hwang Bo-Ram, Fatou Coulibaly, Sarah Nnodim, Josephine Chukwunonye,
 Most red cards (player): 1 – Ligia Moreira, Sarah Nnodim, Catalina Pérez
 Most red cards (match): 1 – Cameroon vs Ecuador, Nigeria vs United States, United States vs Colombia

Multiple World Cups
 Scoring at three or more World Cups 

Appearing in four or more World Cups

Overall results
Bold numbers indicate the maximum values in each column.

By team

By confederation

References

statistics